Guillermo Padrón Montiel (born November 2, 1959) is a Mexican football manager and former player.

After he retired from playing, Padrón became a football coach. He led Veracruz's under-20 side to the semifinals of the 2017 Liga MX youth league.

References

External links

1959 births
Living people
Mexican footballers
Association football midfielders
Club América footballers
Atlas F.C. footballers
Atlético Morelia players
Liga MX players
Club León footballers
Mexican football managers
Footballers from Mexico City